Liza M. Ortiz-Camacho (born September 8, 1974) is a Democratic and Popular Party (PDP) politician in Puerto Rico who is being considered as the PDP's candidate for Puerto Rico's non-voting seat in the United States House of Representatives.

Education

Ortiz graduated cum laude from the University of Puerto Rico in 1996, where she obtained a B.A. majoring in political science.  She obtained her Juris Doctor magna cum laude from Interamerican University of Puerto Rico School of Law in 1999, after spending a summer at the International Studies Center at the José Ortega y Gasset Foundation in Toledo, Spain studying European Community Law and Comparative Spanish Family Law.  In Spain, she obtained a master's degree in Political Studies and completed doctoral studies on Constitutional Law at the Complutense University of Madrid School of Law.

Political life

In 1999, she served as then-congressional candidate Acevedo Vilá's Communications and Media Director. She was elected in 2011 as Puerto Rico's Democratic National Committeewoman.

References

1974 births
Living people
Complutense University of Madrid alumni
Democratic Party (Puerto Rico) politicians
Popular Democratic Party (Puerto Rico) politicians
Puerto Rican lawyers
University of Puerto Rico alumni
Place of birth missing (living people)
Puerto Rican women in politics